Charles Bernard Meadway (16 October 1879 – 1 January 1962) was an Australian rules footballer who played with Carlton and Collingwood in the Victorian Football League (VFL).

Notes

External links 

1879 births
1962 deaths
VFL/AFL players born outside Australia
Carlton Football Club players
Collingwood Football Club players
New Zealand emigrants to Australia
Australian rules footballers from Victoria (Australia)